Degan is an anglicised Irish-language surname, and may refer to:

 Raz Degan (born 1968), Israeli model
 William Degan (20th century), United States Marshal

See also
 Bruce Degen (born 1945), illustrator of The Magic School Bus series of children's books

Anglicised Irish-language surnames